Frösö zoo is a zoo on the island Frösön close to the town of Östersund in Sweden.

Created and owned by Åke Netterström, it covers some 42 hectares and includes several species of tropical carnivores and other exotic animals' species.

A terrarium which covers 1600 m2 exhibits crocodiles, snakes, lizards and different monkeys.

After unsuccessfully trying to sell the zoo, it was reported that the animals will be relocated and the operations will shut down during 2019.

References
 Much of the content of this article comes from the equivalent Swedish-language Wikipedia article.  Retrieved on 6 December 2014. Some of the following references are cited by that Swedish-language article:

External links

Zoos in Sweden
Jämtland County